Penair School is a secondary academy school in Truro, Cornwall, England, for children aged 11 to 16. It is named after Penair House, a mansion built in the late 18th century by Rear-Admiral Robert Carthew Reynolds. It is currently graded as ‘good’ by government inspectors Ofsted, with the last inspection at the time of writing having taken place on 17 May 2017.

The school is situated at the top of St Clement's Hill, and has several playing fields as well as other facilities such as a fitness suite and an AstroTurf pitch. James Davidson became Penair's Headteacher in September 2015 with Robert Sharpe and Mrs Eastburn-Cutts both being Deputy Heads.

Former headteachers
 1991 - 1997 - Pat Mcgovern
 1997 - 2013 - Barbara Vann
 2013 - 2015 - Nicky Edmondson

Notable former pupils
 Jason Dawe, Automotive Journalist at The Sunday Times and TV presenter
 Staff Sergeant Olaf Schmid, George Cross holder
 Tom Voyce, rugby union player, for London Welsh and England

References

Secondary schools in Cornwall
Truro
Training schools in England
Academies in Cornwall